Doctor Strange (Original Motion Picture Soundtrack) is the soundtrack album to the Marvel Studios film Doctor Strange composed by Michael Giacchino. Hollywood Records released the album digitally on October 21, 2016, with a physical release on November 18, 2016.

Background
In May 2016, Michael Giacchino revealed that he would score the film. Director Scott Derrickson called the score "magic in the literal sense of the word" adding Giacchino "is doing what good scorers do, which is he is not just creating music that supports the images, he's adding a third thing to the movie. It becomes something new with his music in there that it didn't have with temp music." The score was recorded at Abbey Road Studios with additional score recorded at Studio Miraval in France. During the recording session, Paul McCartney heard one of Giacchino's cues being recorded, which he likened to The Beatles song "I Am the Walrus".

Track listing
All music composed by Michael Giacchino.

Additional music
At the beginning of the first surgery, "Shining Star" by Earth, Wind & Fire plays. "Feels so Good" by Chuck Mangione was not included in the film's soundtrack. Derrickson, a Bob Dylan fan, looked for a place in the film to include one of his songs, but was unable to find one. However, he included Pink Floyd's "Interstellar Overdrive".

References

2016 soundtrack albums
2010s film soundtrack albums
Marvel Cinematic Universe: Phase Three soundtracks
Doctor Strange (film series)
Michael Giacchino soundtracks
Albums recorded at Studio Miraval